Harold Whitfield (2 February 1919 – 15 May 2013) was a South African cricketer. He played 24 first-class matches for Border between 1936 and 1954.

References

External links
 

1919 births
2013 deaths
South African cricketers
Border cricketers
Sportspeople from Qonce